11 Boötis is a giant star in the northern constellation of Boötes, located about 332 light years away from the Sun.  It is near the lower limit of visibility to the naked eye, appearing as a dim, white-hued star with an apparent visual magnitude of 6.23. This body is moving closer to the Earth with a heliocentric radial velocity of −24 km/s.

Properties
It has a stellar classification of A7 III, matching an evolved A-type giant star. The star is 328 million years old with a projected rotational velocity of 123 km/s. It has 1.67 times the mass of the Sun and is radiating 64 times the Sun's luminosity from its photosphere at an effective temperature of 7,997 K.

References

A-type giants
Boötes
Durchmusterung objects
Bootis, 11
122405
068478
5263